In computing, a normal number is a non-zero number in a floating-point representation which is within the balanced range supported by a given floating-point format: it is a floating point number that can be represented without leading zeros in its significand.

The magnitude of the smallest normal number in a format is given by bemin, where b is the base (radix) of the format (usually 2 or 10) and emin depends on the size and layout of the format.  

Similarly, the magnitude of the largest normal number in a format is given by 

bemax × (b − b1−p), 

where p is the precision of the format in digits and emax is (−emin)+1.

In the IEEE 754 binary and decimal formats, b, p, emin, and emax have the following values:

For example, in the smallest decimal format, the range of positive normal numbers is 10−95 through 9.999999 × 1096.

Non-zero numbers smaller in magnitude than the smallest normal number are called subnormal (or denormal) numbers.  Zero is neither normal nor subnormal.

See also 
 Normalized number

References 

Computer arithmetic